is a 2014 Japanese film directed by Yukihiko Tsutsumi.

Cast
 Yukie Nakama as Naoka Yamada
 Hiroshi Abe as Jiro Ueda
 Katsuhisa Namase as Kenzo Yabe
 Yōko Nogiwa as Satomi Yamada
 Masumi Okada as Yamada's father
 Nasubi as Akira Kanbe
 Noriyuki Higashiyama as Shinichi Kagami
 Kazuki Kitamura as Masashi Tanioka
 Kiko Mizuhara as Shaman

Reception
By January 19, it had grossed ¥0.91 billion (US$8.73 million) at the Japanese box office.

References

External links
 
Trick The Movie: Last Stage at Toho

Films directed by Yukihiko Tsutsumi
Toho films
2010s Japanese films